Stijn Meijer (born 28 November 1999) is a Dutch professional footballer who plays as a forward for German  club SC Verl, on loan from PEC Zwolle.

Career
Meijer made his Eerste Divisie debut for Almere City on 20 August 2018 in a game against Jong AZ, as a starter, and scored on his debut.

On 9 July 2021, he joined Dordrecht.

On 31 August 2022, Meijer signed a two-year contract with PEC Zwolle. On 1 February 2023, Meijer joined SC Verl in Germany on loan.

References

External links
 
 Career stats & Profile - Voetbal International

Living people
1999 births
People from Aalsmeer
Dutch footballers
Footballers from North Holland
Association football forwards
Eerste Divisie players
Tweede Divisie players
Almere City FC players
Excelsior Rotterdam players
FC Dordrecht players
PEC Zwolle players
SC Verl players
Dutch expatriate footballers
Dutch expatriate sportspeople in Spain
Expatriate footballers in Spain
Dutch expatriate sportspeople in Germany
Expatriate footballers in Germany